Peter is a 1934 Austrian-Hungarian comedy film directed by Henry Koster and starring Franciska Gaal, Felix Bressart and Richard Eybner.

Plot
After a young woman and her grandfather run into financial trouble, she (forced by a thief to wear his clothes) tries to earn money selling newspapers, loudly yelling false news to advertise them.

A young doctor arguing that "truth is the mothermilk of the civilisation", destroys the newspapers and tries to leave in his car, but is blocked by her, causing him to destroy a telephone booth.

Arrested still wearing the thief's male clothes with his wig found in the trouser pocket, she and grandfather are dragged in front of an understanding but severe judge who make them to pay for the telephone booth.

The doctor, moved by the tears for having caused trouble for the 'boy' and her grandfather, asks his garage manager to hire 'him' and secretly pays the fine.

When she discovers the doctor has no clients, she starts helping him find some in daring ways. The doctor discovers she is not a boy, but continues the charade.  There is a happy ending when she finds out he has secretly helped her and her grandfather.

Production
The film was made by German-based subsidiary of the American studios Universal Pictures, whom Gaal was under contract to. The rise of the Nazi Party mean that Gaal could no longer work in Germany, so production of her films were switched to Vienna and Budapest.

Its plot was drawn from a stage play by Sándor Nádas. It was made at the Hunnia Film Studios in Budapest. The film's sets were designed by art director Márton Vincze. Josef von Báky, later a leading director, worked as assistant director on the film.

Cast
 Franciska Gaal as 17-year-old Eva 
 Felix Bressart as Eva's grandfather 
 Richard Eybner as a party guest  
 Hans Jaray as Doctor Robert Bandler  
 Sigurd Lohde as a police officer  
 Grete Natzler as Mary  
 Anton Pointner as Steffani  
 Hans Richter as Hobby, an apprentice  
 Imre Ráday as a thief  
 Ludwig Rüth as Panne 
 Etha von Storm 
 Otto Wallburg as Mr. Zöllner, a garage-owner

References

Bibliography 
 Hans-Michael Bock and Tim Bergfelder. The Concise Cinegraph: An Encyclopedia of German Cinema. Berghahn Books.

External links 
 

1934 films
1934 musical comedy films
Austrian musical comedy films
Hungarian musical comedy films
1930s German-language films
Films directed by Henry Koster
Films produced by Joe Pasternak
Cross-dressing in film
Hungarian black-and-white films
Austrian black-and-white films
Universal Pictures films